The Geydhoshu Kandu is the narrow and deep channel in between Fasdhoothere and Southern Maalhosmadulu Atoll of the Maldives.

References
 Divehiraajjege Jōgrafīge Vanavaru. Muhammadu Ibrahim Lutfee. G.Sōsanī.

Channels of the Maldives
Channels of the Indian Ocean